The 2021 Delaware State Hornets football team represented Delaware State University as a member of the Mid-Eastern Athletic Conference (MEAC) in the 2021 NCAA Division I FCS football season. The Hornets, led by fourth-year head coach Rod Milstead, played their home games at Alumni Stadium.

Schedule

References

Delaware State
Delaware State Hornets football seasons
Delaware State Hornets football